Donald Grant McLeod (born 9 April 1959 in Whangarei) is a former field hockey player from New Zealand. McLeod, the younger brother of Olympian gold medalist Neil McLeod, followed his brother's footsteps in attending the Olympics with his national team in 1984 and 1992, where they finished seventh and eighth respectively.

References

External links
 

New Zealand male field hockey players
Olympic field hockey players of New Zealand
Field hockey players at the 1984 Summer Olympics
Field hockey players at the 1992 Summer Olympics
1959 births
Living people
Field hockey players from Whangārei